Zorzila may refer to:
Zorzila (Pisidia), a town of ancient Pisidia, now in Turkey
Zorzila, Gorj, a village in the municipality of Ciuperceni, Gorj, Romania